The 2016–17 Belgian Basketball Cup season, for sponsorship reasons bpost cup, was the 63rd edition of the national cup competition for men's basketball in Belgium. The final was played on 19 February 2017 between Limburg United and defending cup holders Oostende. Oostende won its 18th title and its fourth Cup in a row.

Format
Teams from the Basketball League Belgium Division I, the Top Division 1 and Top Division 2 (the first three divisions in Belgian basketball) compete in the competition. In the first round teams from the Top Division I and 2 play in 12 groups. From the second round, teams from the BLB Division I enter the competition. In the second round, the quarter- and semi-finals a double legged format is used. When a Division I  team faces off against a team from a lower league, no second leg is played. The Final is decided by a single game.

Bracket

Final

References

Belgian Basketball Cup
Cup